Nanur Airport is an airport in the Wadi Maymun Darraj region of Libya, located approximately 200 km south-southeast of Tripoli in the Libyan desert.   Although listed as a civil airport, it appears to function as a reserve Libyan Air Force airfield.  It comprises a long runway with a parallel taxiway and a parking ramp.  There are no permanent structures visible, nor are there any production oilfields in the area.

World War II
During World War II the airfield, then known as Darragh Airfield was used as a military airfield by the  United States Army Air Force Ninth Air Force 57th Fighter Group during the North African Campaign against Axis forces.  The 57th flew P-40 Warhawks from the airfield between 19 January-3 March 1943 before moving forward with the British Eighth Army.

The current airfield appears to be overlaid on its World War II predecessor facility.

See also
Transport in Libya
List of airports in Libya

References

External links
OpenStreetMap - Nanur
Nanur Airport Database
OurAirports - Nanur

Airfields of the United States Army Air Forces in Libya
Airports in Libya
World War II airfields in Libya